Eric Alister Bull (28 September 1886 – 14 May 1954) was an Australian cricketer active from 1913 to 1920 who played for New South Wales and the Australian Imperial Force Touring XI. He was born in Bourke, New South Wales and died in Sydney. He appeared in 23 first-class matches as a right-handed batsman who bowled leg break. He scored 595 runs with a highest score of 42 and took four wickets with a best performance of two for 8.

Notes

1886 births
1954 deaths
Australian cricketers
Australian Imperial Force Touring XI cricketers
New South Wales cricketers
People from Bourke, New South Wales
Cricketers from New South Wales